Sociedad Cultural Deportiva Durango is a Spanish football team based in Durango, Biscay, in the autonomous community of Basque Country. Founded in 1919 it plays in Tercera División RFEF – Group 4, holding home matches at Estadio Tabira, with a capacity of 3,000 spectators.

History
In the 2017–18 season the club won the Group 4 of the Tercera División and promoted to Segunda División B.

Season to season

7 seasons in Segunda División B
41 seasons in Tercera División
1 season in Tercera División RFEF

Current squad

Honours
Tercera División: 1982–83, 1986–87, 2017–18

References

External links
Official website 
Futbolme team profile 
Club & stadium history - Estadios de España 

Football clubs in the Basque Country (autonomous community)
Association football clubs established in 1919
1919 establishments in Spain
Sport in Biscay